Excell International School was a small independent, co-educational, day and boarding school located in Boston, Lincolnshire, England for children aged between 3 and 18.  An amalgamation of two previous schools, Conway School and Maypole House School.  Parents were told in a letter that the school and the Chatterbox Nursery associated with it would close on 16 July 2010, as they had been suffering "financial difficulties due to dwindling numbers".

History

Conway School
The school was established in 1851 by Martha and Mary Gee as Boston Middle Girls School at George Street, Boston and was "intended for female children whose parents are in the rank next above the actual poor". It subsequently moved to its current site at Tunnard Street, at a rebuilding cost of £800.

In 1905 the school was renamed as Conway School and established a good local reputation. The school became coeducational in the 1950s, achieving high levels of annual passes in the 11+ examination. In 2000 Conway School had 100% passes in the 11+ for the third year running.

Head teacher controversy and problems with new ownership
Former owner and head teacher Simon McElwain was jailed for two years, in October 2007, after admitting the possession of child pornography images. He stepped down from his position in November 2004. Under McElwain the school had 140 pupils and employed 19 staff.

In April 2005 McElwain sold the school to David and Caroline Wilson. The new head teacher at this point was Philomena Rynne. Around this time, as the charges against McElwain became public, student numbers declined, although on the whole parents were supportive of the teaching staff, whom they knew to be doing their best for the pupils under difficult circumstances. The contribution of staff was also recognised in a report by one of Her Majesty's Inspectors following a visit in October 2007.

The pupil roll dropped after the transfer of ownership, and the school closed on 3 January 2007.  There was an attempt to make the school a limited company, but this was not generally known to parents before the closure, when a letter headed "Conway School (Boston) Ltd" dated 22 December was sent to the remaining parents.  However the matter of the proposed transfer to limited company status was mentioned in at least one of the Employment Tribunals brought against the new owners by members of staff.

Maypole House school
Maypole House School was founded in 1884, occupying Well Vale Hall in Well near Alford. Maypole House school was sold in June in 2005 To Mr Omokhodion and Well Vale Hall was leased to the new owners of Maypole House school from 2005 to 2007 only. Maypole House received a Food Hygiene Award from the East Lindsey District Council in May 2006. In January 2007 the new Maypole house School management team took over the site at Tunnard Street and renamed as Excell International School, Maypole House School ceased.

Merger
Conway School and Maypole House merged in January 2007 to form the Excell International College In Boston. They also started to take boarders and extended the age range of pupils from 3–18. In January 2008 it was announced that none of its students attained five or more A*-C GCSEs.

Closure
Parents were sent an unsigned letter, dated 2 July 2010, confirming that the school and nursery would close on 16 July 2010. Director Anthony Omokhodion said "we have received an offer from the landlords for the present premises and we have accepted their offer". Citing "financial difficulties" in the letter, Mr Omokhodion thanked parents for their "support during these trying times". No future plans for the building in Boston have been announced.  The premises belong to St Botolph's Church ("Boston Stump") and were leased to the various owners of the school, the Misses Gee having given the land for the purpose of providing an educational establishment.

References

Schools Shock, Boston Standard  9 July 2010

External links

Boarding schools in Lincolnshire
Educational institutions established in 1851
Educational institutions disestablished in 2010
Defunct schools in Lincolnshire
Schools in Boston, Lincolnshire
1851 establishments in England
2010 disestablishments in England